Waithira, is a 2017 Kenyan-South African biographical documentary film directed by Eva Njoki Munyiri and co-produced by director himself with Stefan Gieren and Jean Meeran for Team Tarbaby. The film deals with director Eva Njoki Munyiri's history and its intersections with forgotten Kenyan history, pop culture and the diaspora.

Waithira received positive reviews and won several awards at international film festivals. It has been screened at festivals such as South Africa's DIFF & Encounters, Luxor African Film Festival, Créteil International Women's Film Festival, etc. In 2018, the film was represented at Munich International Documentary Festival.

Plot

Cast
 Jimmy Kamau Waithira
 Eva Munyiri 
 Benjamin Fernandez 
 Lois Waithira Kamau
 Munthoni as young Guka
 Kamau as Young Boy Messenger
 Eric Seme Otero
 Kamau wa Munyiri
 Lois Waithira Wendrock	
 Kamilla Wendrock	
 Thomas Wendrock	
 Eli Wendrock	
 Eileen Waithira Abisgold	
 Leila Abisgold	
 Gage Griffiths

References

External links
 
 Waithira on YouTube
 Waithira

2017 films
South African documentary films
Kenyan documentary films